Kim Yoo-jin, better known by his gaming handle sOs, is a Korean professional StarCraft II player. He is the first two-time StarCraft II World Championship Series winner, claiming the title in 2013 and 2015. Kim spent most of his career playing for the Jin Air Green Wings team, from 2013–2020. He is a Protoss player.  He announced his retirement from professional gaming in 2021.

Career
In 2013, sOs beat Lee Jaedong at the World Championship Series (WCS).

In 2015, he repeated his WCS title after beating Life in the finals.

In 2018 he made another deep run in the WCS.  soS defeated his Jin Air teammate Cho "Maru" Seong Ju 3:0 in the quarterfinal; Maru was one of the favorites after Maru had won three GSLs in a row.  sOs lost 0:3 to Kim "Stats" Dae-yeob in the semifinal.

sOs left Jin Air Green Wings for a new Korean team, Team NV, in November 2020.  In September 2021, sOs announced his retirement from StarCraft on Team NV's Instagram.

Tournament results
 3-4th - 2013 WCS Season 1 Korea GSL	
 2nd - 2013 WCS Season 1	
 1st - 2013 WCS Global Finals	
 2nd - Red Bull Battle Grounds New York City	
 1st - IEM Season VIII - World Championship	
 1st - 2014 Hot6ix Cup	
 3-4th - 2015 Global StarCraft II League Season 2	
 1st - 2015 MSI Masters Gaming Arena	
 3-4th - 2015 DreamHack Open: Stockholm	
 1st - 2015 WCS Global Finals
 2nd - 2016 Global StarCraft II League Season 2
 2nd - 2017 Global StarCraft II League Season 3
 2nd - 2018 IEM Season XII - PyeongChang
 2nd - 2018 AfreecaTV GSL Super Tournament 2
 3-4th - 2018 WCS Global Finals

Playstyle
sOs is known for his creative play, often going for unusual build orders and "cheeses": high risk, high reward unconventional openings such as cannon rushing.  For example, at the finals of IEM Katowice 2014, sOs opened with the extremely high-risk proxy gateways (placing production buildings in the opponent's own base) strategy twice in a row in a best of seven against herO (Kim Joon-Ho) and won both games with it, and won the entire series 4–1.

References

StarCraft players
South Korean esports players
Living people
Jin Air Green Wings players
Year of birth missing (living people)